Or Give Me Death is an album by Aqueduct. It was released February 20, 2007 on Barsuk Records.

Track listing
 "Lying in the Bed I've Made"
 "Living a Lie"
 "Broken Records"
 "Keep It Together"
 "Just the Way I Are"
 "Unavailable"
 "Split the Difference"
 "As You Wish"
 "Zero the Controls"
 "Wasted Energy"
 "You'll Get Yours"
 "With Friends Like These"

References 

2007 albums
Aqueduct (band) albums